Driehuis may refer to:
 Driehuis (surname)
 Driehuis